Sibos (previously known as SWIFT International Banking Operations Seminar) is the world’s global, premier financial services event. This annual conference, exhibition, networking event is organized by SWIFT for the financial industry and is held annually around the world in major cities. Sibos brings together thousands of business leaders, decision makers and topic experts from across the financial ecosystem. Industry leading speakers and conference sessions, partners, and multiple networking events make Sibos the perfect platform to collectively shape the future of the sector.

History 
The first Sibos was held in 1978 in Brussels and has since been held in multiple European cities such as Amsterdam, Copenhagen, Berlin, and Helsinki, as well as other cities (such as Boston and Toronto) in North America and Sydney in Australia. In recent years, it has also been held more regularly in Asia and Oceania like China, Japan, Singapore, UAE, Australia and others. The conference has an average annual turnout of over 7,000 participants from around the world representing the financial services industry. The highest turnout was at the 2019 conference held in London which had about 11,500 participants.

Purpose 
People who work in financial markets around the world participate as attendees and exhibitors to discuss issues relevant to the financial industry. Topics vary by year, but remain relevant to the current landscape of the global financial ecosystem in the areas of payments, securities, risk management, innovation, and cash management and trade.

References

External links 
 Sibos Official Website. Retrieved October 4, 2012

Banking
Business conferences
International conferences